The 2003 CIS football season began on August 29, 2003, and concluded with the 39th Vanier Cup national championship on November 22 at the SkyDome in Toronto, Ontario, with the Laval Rouge et Or winning their second championship. Twenty-seven universities across Canada competed in CIS football this season, the highest level of amateur play in Canadian football, under the auspices of Canadian Interuniversity Sport (CIS).

Awards and records

Awards 
 Hec Crighton Trophy – Tommy Denison, Queen's
 Presidents' Trophy –  Neil McKinlay, Simon Fraser
 Russ Jackson Award – Curt McLellan, Queen's
 J. P. Metras Trophy – Ibrahim Khan, Simon Fraser
 Peter Gorman Trophy – Maxime Gagnier, Montreal

All-Canadian team 
 First team 

 Offence 
 QB Tommy Denison Queen's
 HB Jesse Lumsden McMaster
 HB Jarred Winkel Alberta
 WR Craig Spear Queen's
 WR Gilles Colon Bishop's
 IR Brendan Mahoney Simon Fraser
 IR J.-Fred. Tremblay Laval
 OT Paul Archer Saint Mary's
 OT Ibrahim Khan Simon Fraser
 OG Derek Armstrong StFX
 OG Carl Gourgues Laval
 C J.-Francois Joncas Laval

 Defence 
 DE Justin Shakell Laurier
 DE Troy Cunningham Concordia
 DT Ryan Gottselig Saskatchewan
 DT Nick Comly Acadia
 LB Shad McLachlan Acadia
 LB Neil McKinlay Simon Fraser
 LB Mickey Donovan Concordia
 CB Pascal Masson Laval
 CB Eric Nielsen Acadia
 DB Guillaume Roy McGill
 DB Sebastian Clovis Saint Mary's
 FS Jeremy Steeves StFX

 Special teams 
 K Jon Ryan Regina
 P Anand Pillai McGill
 Second Team 

 Offence 
 QB Mathieu Bertrand Laval
 RB Derek Medler Laurier
 RB Les Mullings Saint Mary's
 WR Andrew Gallant StFX
 WR Shane Ostapowich Regina
 IR Andy Fantuz Western
 IR Vaughan Swart McMaster
 OT Ryan Jeffrey Laurier
 OT J.-Francois Ostiguy Laval
 OG Dave Forde McMaster
 OG Adrian Olenick Saskatchewan
 C Jeff Melis Laurier

 Defence 
 DE Jack Gaudreau Queen's
 DE Dan Federkeil Calgary
 DT Matt Kirk Queen's
 DT Miguel Robede Laval
 LB Tristan Clovis McMaster
 LB Kevin MacNeill Laurier
 LB Agustin Barrenechea Calgary
 CB Clinton John York
 CB Eric Duchene Saskatchewan
 DB Kyler White Alberta
 DB Reid Smith Acadia
 FS Maxime Gagnier Montreal

 Special teams 
 K Matt Sharpe Acadia
 P Mike Ray McMaster

Results

Regular-season standings 
Note: GP = Games Played, W = Wins, L = Losses, OTL = Overtime Losses, PF = Points For, PA = Points Against, Pts = Points

Teams in bold have earned playoff berths.

 Top 10 

Ranks in italics'' are teams not ranked in the top 10 poll but received votes.
NR = Not Ranked. Source:

Championships 
The Vanier Cup was played between the champions of the Mitchell Bowl and the Uteck Bowl, the national semi-final games. In 2003, the Uteck Bowl replaced the long-standing Churchill Bowl, which had been competed for since 1989 as a national semi-final game. Along with the Mitchell Bowl, the semi-final games now worked on a fully rotating basis, with the winners of the Canada West conference Hardy Trophy visiting the winners of the Atlantic conference Loney Bowl championship for the Uteck Bowl. The Ontario conference's Yates Cup championship team hosted the Dunsmore Cup Quebec champion for the Uteck Bowl.

Vanier Cup

Notes 

U Sports football seasons
CIS football season